The second British Invasion of the Danish West Indies took place in December 1807 when a British fleet captured the Danish islands of St Thomas on 22 December and Santa Cruz on 25 December. The Danes did not resist and the invasion was bloodless. This British occupation of the Danish West Indies lasted until 20 November 1815, when Britain returned the islands to Denmark.

Background
During the later stages of the French Revolutionary Wars (1793-1802), Denmark–Norway, Prussia, and Sweden established the Second League of Armed Neutrality (1800-1801), intending to protect their trade in the Baltic from the British. However, Britain attacked Denmark with the First Battle of Copenhagen in April 1801. Slightly in advance of that, a British fleet arrived at St Thomas at the end of March. The Danes accepted the Articles of Capitulation the British proposed and the British occupied the islands without a shot being fired. The British occupation lasted until April 1802, when the British returned the islands to Denmark.

After the outbreak of the Napoleonic Wars, in 1804 Britain embarked on a campaign in the West Indies. By 1810 every single French, Dutch and Danish colony there was firmly under allied (mainly British) control.

The occupation of the Danish West Indies was a consequence of the British fear that Denmark–Norway would ally with Napoleon. Hostilities between Denmark–Norway and the United Kingdom broke out again by the Second Battle of Copenhagen in August 1807, when the British attacked the Danish capital to ensure that the Danish-Norwegian fleet did not fall into the hands of Napoleon.

In the West Indies, Admiral Sir Alexander Cochrane had been in readiness to invade the Danish colonies since receiving a warning on 2 September 1807 that hostilities with Denmark–Norway were likely to break out. In October vessels of the British Royal Navy started capturing Danish vessels at sea.

The invasion
On 15 December 1807  arrived at Barbados with the news of war with Denmark. The expedition included troops from the 70th and 90th Regiments of Foot under the overall army commander, General Henry Bowyer.

St Thomas surrendered on 22 December and St Croix on 25 December. A prize money notice in the London Gazette in 1816 gives a list of the vessels and army units that participated in the campaign.

Royal Navy vessels
This list includes both vessels that Cochrane mentioned in his dispatch concerning the invasion, and vessels mentioned in the prize money notice. The two sources overlap, but are not identical.

 
 Blonde
 
 
 
 
 
 
 
 
 
 
 
 Melville

Notes

Citations

1807 in the Caribbean
Campaigns of the Napoleonic Wars
Conflicts in 1807
1807 in the British Empire
1807 in the Danish colonial empire
19th century in the Danish West Indies
Danish West Indies
December 1807 events
Danish West Indies